Mirko Miceli (born 16 June 1991) is an Italian football player who plays as a defender for  club Turris.

Club career
He made his Serie B debut for Varese on 2 April 2011 in a game against Cittadella.

On 27 August 2020 he signed a 2-year contract with Avellino.

On 18 August 2021 he joined Virtus Francavilla.

On 10 January 2023, Miceli moved to Turris.

References

External links
 
 
 

1991 births
Living people
Sportspeople from Cosenza
Footballers from Calabria
Italian footballers
Association football defenders
Serie B players
Serie C players
Serie D players
S.S.D. Varese Calcio players
U.S. Alessandria Calcio 1912 players
Carrarese Calcio players
Olbia Calcio 1905 players
U.S. Viterbese 1908 players
A.S. Sambenedettese players
U.S. Avellino 1912 players
Royale Union Saint-Gilloise players
Virtus Francavilla Calcio players
S.S. Turris Calcio players
Italian expatriate footballers
Italian expatriate sportspeople in Belgium
Expatriate footballers in Belgium